The tenth season of the American competitive reality television series MasterChef premiered on Fox on May 29, 2019, and concluded on September 18, 2019. Gordon Ramsay, Aarón Sánchez, and Joe Bastianich all returned as judges. The season was won by creeler Dorian Hunter, with former Army interrogator Sarah Faherty finishing second, and college student Nick DiGiovanni placing third.

Top 20
Except where otherwise cited, source for names, hometowns and occupations: Ages and nicknames as given on air.

Elimination table

 (WINNER) This cook won the competition.
 (RUNNER-UP) This cook finished as a runner-up in the finals.
 (WIN) The cook won the individual challenge (Mystery Box Challenge/ Skills Test or Elimination Test).
 (WIN) The cook was on the winning team in the Team Challenge and directly advanced to the next round.
 (HIGH) The cook was one of the top entries in the individual challenge but didn't win.
 (IN) The cook wasn't selected as a top or bottom entry in an individual challenge.
 (IN) The cook wasn't selected as a top or bottom entry in a team challenge.
 (IMM) The cook didn't have to compete in that round of the competition and was safe from elimination.
 (PT) The cook was on the losing team in the Team Challenge, competed in the Pressure Test, and advanced.
 (NPT) The cook was on the losing team in the Team Challenge, did not compete in the Pressure Test, and advanced.
 (LOW) The cook was one of the bottom entries in an individual challenge or Pressure Test, and they advanced.
 (LOW) The cook was one of the bottom entries in the Team Challenge and they advanced.
 (ELIM) The cook was eliminated from MasterChef.

This contestant was on the winning team but was selected to compete in the elimination test by their team captain.

Episodes

References

2019 American television seasons
MasterChef (American TV series)